The Canadian fifty-cent coin is a Canadian coin worth 50 cents. The coin's reverse depicts the coat of arms of Canada. At the opening ceremonies for the Ottawa branch of the Royal Mint, held on January 2, 1908, Governor General Earl Grey struck the Dominion of Canada's first domestically produced coin. It was a silver fifty-cent coin bearing the effigy of King Edward VII.

Though it is regularly minted, it is not made in large quantities (approximate annual average production of 150,000), and since 2004 has only been available to the public directly from the mint. It is very rare to encounter this denomination in everyday transactions, since there seems to be the mistaken belief among many Canadians that the coin itself is rare and thus of value in excess of 50 cents. Most times, when a 50-cent coin is exchanged in a transaction, it is saved by its recipient. People quite commonly, upon being presented with 50-cent coins, question the legality of the coin, because of the non-circulating status of the denomination. The coin occupies a similar status to that of the United States half-dollar coin. Vending machines do not generally accept it, even when they accept coins of both higher and lower value.

A largely unsuccessful attempt was made by the Royal Canadian Mint to promote the use of the coin when a special edition was released in 2002 marking the 50th anniversary of the accession of Elizabeth II to the throne. After this failed promotion, the mint stopped distributing 50-cent coins to banks and now only sells them in rolls or in coin sets available directly from their Numismatic Department at twice their face value, or $25 per roll of 25 coins.

The mint's website lists the 2007 coat of arms 50-cent coin as "rarely seen yet replete with tradition".

History of composition

1921 issue rarity 

During the early to mid-1920s, demand for 50-cent coins was minimal. Only 28,000 coins were issued between 1921 and 1929. When greater demand for the denomination arose in 1929, the Master of the Ottawa Mint decided to melt the stock of 1920 and 1921 coins. It amounted to a total of 480,392 coins. The decision was due to the belief that the public would suspect counterfeits if a large number of coins dated 1920 and 1921 were placed into circulation. It is believed that 75 or so of the 1921 coins have survived, mainly from sets that were sold at the time. Long known as the "king of Canadian coins", this coin brings a price commensurate with its rarity and reputation, with a high grade example (PCGS MS-66) having sold for US$227,546 (this price includes buyers premium but not the taxes) in a January 2010 Heritage Auction. The highest graded specimen is graded by PCGS at MS-67 and sold (by Diverse Equities) in the year 2000 to a private collector for the then sum of US$400,000. Today this coin would most likely bring US$1 million at an auction.

Condition rarity: Almost all examples are found in good to very good condition, which means in heavily circulated condition. Based on the ICCS report of 2012 only 1 has been graded in fine condition. A total of 0 have been graded in very fine and 0 in extra fine. There are also 6 known in AU condition. Only 3 mint state examples of the King of Canadian coins exist making it extremely elusive and desirable. On average a mint state example comes up for sale once every 10 years and draws a lot of attention from wealthy buyers.

Values in very good (VG-8) and gem mint state (MS-65): As of 2012 the value is estimated at US$45,000 in very good condition and is estimated at US$250,000 to US$350,000 in gem mint condition. These are average trends calculated by using prices sold in the past few years.

2000-P issue rarity
The 2000-P 50-cent coin is another Canadian numismatic rarity. Approximately 276 of the 2000-P 50-cent coins are known to have been minted. Each of these 276 coins was mounted in a clock as gifts to mint employees. This makes the 2000-P 50-cent coin one of the rarest Canadian half-dollars ever produced.

Commemorative editions

First strikes

References 

1870 establishments in Canada
Coins of Canada
Fifty-cent coins